Yaaruda Mahesh is a 2013 Tamil-language adult comedy film directed by R. Madhan Kumar, starring Sundeep Kishan and Dimple Chopade. The film was shot around Chennai and Kerala. It was produced by Red Studios and Colour Frames. Its soundtrack and background score were composed by Gopi Sunder, while Raana handled the cinematography. The film released on 26 April to below average reviews. It did average business at the box office.

Plot
The film opens with the protagonist Shiva going to college for an exam, where his pen runs out of ink. He receives a new one from the girl next to him, Sindhya. He immediately falls for her and starts following her. He attends an educational tour with Sindhya, Vasanth, and Priya (Vasanth's lover). Eventually, Sindhya too falls for Shiva. He then finds out that she got the top rank in the test and a scholarship to the US. Before she leaves, Sindhya invites Shiva to breakfast at her house while her family is out. At her house, Shiva strips her, and the two end up having sex. Sindhya then goes to the US. She comes back three months later, saying that she has some private information to tell him. When she gets back, she announces to Shiva that she is pregnant, thinking that no one else is in the house. However, Shiva's parents overhear this, and they scold the two for having sex.

The film skips ahead a few years to show Shiva and Sindhya, husband and wife, having a child. Sindhya is working, while Shiva is an unemployed husband, looking after the child at home. Sindhya's brother Randy, a psychiatrist, tries to help by setting up a trick for Shiva to discover his interests. He sets up a plot in which Shiva overhears Sindhya talking to a person named Mahesh who is really Randy, making Shiva think that the child is not his, but someone else's. Sindhya and Randy want Shiva to overhear them talking. Shiva gets suspicious about who Mahesh is and starts getting data from the library, helped by Vasanth. The climax is in the people he meets and he finally figures who it is. He accuses Sindhya and tries to kill the child. His family and Randy then explain what happened. He then rewrites the test and passes. The movie ends with Shiva getting a job and Randy still on his case on whether he is back to normal.

Cast

 Sundeep Kishan as Shiva
 Dimple Chopade as Sindhya
 Jagan as Vasanth
 Srinath as Randy
 Robo Shankar as Gopal
 Venkat Sundar as Military
 Sneha Ramesh as Priya
 Livingston as Shiva's father
 Singamuthu as Military's father
 Uma as Shiva's mother
 Swaminathan 
 Neelu Nasreen
 Ajith Kumar
 Archana Harish as Vasanth's wife
 Nellai Siva
 KPY Ramar
 Vadivel Balaji
 Sana Oberoi (special appearance in the song "Odum Unakkithu")

Release
The satellite rights of the film were sold to Sun TV. The film was given an "A" certificate by the Indian Censor Board. The film released in 72 screens on 26 April 2013 with another movie, Naan Rajavaga Pogiren.

Box office
The film opened with 90 shows on its first weekend in the Chennai box office. It was removed after one week. The film's final gross was more than  worldwide. The film was declared an average grosser. The film was a flop.

Critical reception
The film received below average reviews from critics. The Times of India wrote, "If double-meaning, adult jokes are your cup of tea, you will enjoy this movie." Indianexpress wrote, "With a wafer-thin plot, the debutant director weaves together a string of incidents. At times, it seems more like a theater of the absurd, with quirky characters and scenes added on just for its bizarre humor quotient, rather than for its relevance to the plot." Behindwoods wrote, "To sum it up, Yaaruda Mahesh is a unidirectional product that targets youth with liberal dose of adult humor but is not powerful enough to sustain the interests through the entire length of the film."

Soundtrack
The soundtrack was composed by Gopi Sundar.

 "Yaaruda Andha Mahesh" — Gopi Sundar, Anna Katherina
 "Pudhu Paarvai" — Haricharan, Priya Himesh
 "Vayadhai Keduthu" — Anna Katherina, Suchith Suresan
 "Odum Unakkithu" — Anna Katherina, Suchith Suresan
 "Yemaathita" — Mukesh Mohamed, Gopi Sundar
 "Uyire Uyiril" — Gopi Sundar

References

External links
 
 Official website

2013 films
2010s sex comedy films
2013 romantic comedy films
2010s Tamil-language films
Indian romantic comedy films
Indian sex comedy films
Films scored by Gopi Sundar
2013 directorial debut films